= C-League (disambiguation) =

C-League is Cambodian soccer league.

C-League may also refer to:

- Canadian Soccer League, Canadian soccer league
- Chinese Super League, Chinese soccer league
